Mayuranathaswamy Temple, Mayiladuthurai or Mayuranathar Temple is a Hindu temple in the town of Mayiladuthurai (formerly known as Mayavaram or Mayuram) in Tamil Nadu, India. The temple is dedicated to Lord Mayuranathaswamy, a form of Shiva, and has given its name to the town itself. The main icon is a  lingam and the presiding deity is called Mayuranathar because the Hindu goddess Parvathi worshipped Shiva here in the form of a mayura.

On the day of the new moon in the Tamil month of Aippasi (November–December), religious Hindus have a ceremonial bath in the temple tank as it is believed to purify them from sins. An annual dance festival called the Mayura Natyanjali festival is celebrated within the precincts of the temple each year.

Significance 
Thiruvayyaru, Mayiladuthurai, Thiruvidaimaruthur, Thiruvenkadu, Chayavanam and Srivanchiyam are considered equivalents of Kasi. Like in Kasi, where the city is centered around Kashi Vishwanath Temple, the temples in these towns along the banks of river Cauvery, namely, Aiyarappar temple in Thiruvaiyaru, Mahalingeswarar temple in Thiruvidaimarudur, Mayuranathaswamy temple in Mayiladuthurai, Chayavaneswarar temple in Sayavanam, Swetharanyeswarar temple in Thiruvenkadu, Srivanchinadhaswamy Koil in Srivanchiyam are the centerpieces of the towns. The temple is counted as one of the temples built on the banks of River Kaveri.

The temple is one of the canonical shrines of the 275 Paadal Petra Sthalams – Shiva temples glorified in the early medieval Tevaram poems by Tamil Saivite Nayanar Tirugnanasambandar.

Architecture

. There are three smaller shrines to the Hindu god Ganesha and another to Shiva as Nataraja or "Lord of Dance". One of the sculptures in the temple represent Shiva embracing Goddess Parvathi. According to Sthala Purana, the goddess Parvathi, the consort of Shiva, once offended him. Shiva was so annoyed he cursed Parvathi to be born as a lowly peahen. Later, when Parvathi repented, Shiva reduced this sentence. Parvathi had to pray first at Mylapore and then at Mayiladuthurai, at the end of which she was ridden of her curse and became known as "Abhayambal". It is believed that Brahma, Lakshmi, sage Agastya, Manmatha, birds and animals worshipped Mayuranathar.

History 

 The oldest inscriptions on the temple walls date to the time of Kulothunga Chola I. Massive renovations were carried out during 1907–1927 by Devakottai AL. VR. P. Veerappa Chettiar and Pethaperumal Chettiar. In May 1927, a temple entry of Dalits was organised on a big scale by the proponents of the Self Respect Movement thereby resulting in a huge clash.

Architecture 
The Mayuranathaswami temple is located in the southern part of Mayiladuthurai about a mile from the Kaveri River. The gopura at the eastern entrance to the temple is nine storeys high  The idol of Durga near the northern entrance of the temple is expertly sculpted and differs from those in other temples. On the temple walls, there is the sculpture of a devotee trying to sever his head as an offering to the God.

 This bath purifies a person of sins because the waters of the river Ganges and other Indian rivers mingle with the waters of the Kaveri river in this tank on this particular day.

Gallery

Notes

References

External links

Padal Petra Stalam
Shiva temples in Mayiladuthurai district
Temples in Tamil Nadu